Portage College is a public board-governed community college in Lac La Biche, Alberta, Canada. Portage has seven campus locations throughout northeastern Alberta.

History
In 1968, Alberta NewStart was established in Lac La Biche as part of the federal government’s initiative to research basic adult education. NewStart offered instruction in areas as diverse as academic upgrading, trapping, wild fur management, and oilfield management. However, after several months the government decided to close the facility and cease the research. A group of Aboriginal students faced with the pending closure of their school decided to challenge the government by staging a sit-in. The group was successful, and the government awarded a grant to continue the NewStart program. The school took on a new name “Pe-Ta-Pun” meaning “New Dawn.”

In 1973, the Alberta government took over the program, reopening it as the province’s fifth Alberta Vocational Centre. From 1973 to 1980 programs and services expanded to include community-based programs. In 1980, the Minister of Advanced Education announced plans to replace the vocational centre’s temporary facilities with a new campus, which was opened in 1985. A board of governors was established for the college in 1998 and the following year the Minister of Advanced Education and Career Development approved a change of name to “Portage College.”

Locations
The main campus is located in Lac La Biche, Alberta and regional service centres are located in Cold Lake and St. Paul. Additional campuses are found in Goodfish Lake, Frog Lake, Saddle Lake, and Boyle.

Programs
Portage College offers over 30 certificate and diploma programs, career programs, trades and technical, academic upgrading, business, university studies, human services, health and wellness and native arts and culture. Continuing education is offered in the fields of business, university studies, human services, health and wellness, native arts and culture, trades and technical careers.

Museum of Aboriginal Peoples' Art and Artifacts 
The museum is housed at the Portage College Corporate Centre and contains nearly 2000 Indigenous artworks and artifacts. The exhibits provide an in-depth look at North American Aboriginal Art from First Nations, Métis and Inuit cultures. Since 2018 the museum houses a permanent collection of the Professional Native Indian Artists Inc. (Daphne Odjig, Alex Janvier, Joseph Sánchez, Norval Morrisseau, Eddy Cobiness, Carl Ray and Jackson Beardy).

Athletics
Portage College is home to five collegiate teams including men's and women's soccer, men's hockey, golf and curling. The teams compete in the Alberta Colleges Athletic Conference, consisting of teams throughout Alberta and Saskatchewan. Voyageur home games and practices are held at the Bold Center in Lac La Biche, a 233,000 square foot facility with a seating capacity of 1000.

The College Team logo depicts the traditional voyageur that used to travel on the lakes and rivers of northeastern Alberta. Team colors are blue, green and grey.

Honorary graduates
The following have been given honorary degrees from Portage College for their work in the community and their continued promotion of the College.

See also
List of universities and colleges in Alberta
Education in Alberta

References
All facts, unless otherwise stated, are from Portage College's web site:
Portage College website

External links
Portage College website

Lac La Biche County
Colleges in Alberta
Educational institutions established in 1968